Events in the year 2018 in Laos.

Incumbents
Party General Secretary: Bounnhang Vorachith
President: Bounnhang Vorachith
Prime Minister: Thongloun Sisoulith

Events

23 July – The collapse of Saddle Dam D, part of a larger hydroelectric dam system under construction in southeast Laos's Champasak Province, lead to widespread destruction and homelessness in neighbouring Attapeu Province.

Deaths

4 January – Sauryavong Savang, royal (b. 1937).

References

 
2010s in Laos
Years of the 21st century in Laos
Laos
Laos